Sea pink is a common name for several plants and may refer to:
 Armeria spp.
 Sabatia stellaris